Burimamide is an antagonist at the H2 and H3 histamine receptors. It is largely inactive as an H2 antagonist at physiological pH, but its H3 affinity is 100x higher. It is a thiourea derivative.

Burimamide was first developed by scientists at Smith, Kline & French (SK&F; now GlaxoSmithKline) in their intent to develop a histamine antagonist for the treatment of peptic ulcers. The discovery of burimamide ultimately led to the development of cimetidine (Tagamet).

See also
 Metiamide
 Cimetidine

References

H2 receptor antagonists
H3 receptor antagonists
Imidazoles
Thioureas